James Leonard Reinsch (June 28, 1908 – May 9, 1991) was a broadcasting executive who became president and CEO of COX Communications. He advised four US Presidents. He assisted the White House Press Secretary office in 1945, during the transition from President Franklin D. Roosevelt to President Harry Truman, and advised Winston Churchill on his 1946 "Iron Curtain" speech.

Career
Reinsch was born in Streator, Illinois in 1908. He majored in Advertising at Northwestern University, where he won the D.F. Keller prize for this thesis. He took over the development of what was then WHIO for Governor Cox. Reinsch was sent to Atlanta, in 1939, when Cox purchased the Atlanta Journal and Georgian and the radio stations. He was put in charge of WSB radio. In 1942 he was put in charge of the three radio stations; WIOD Miami, WSB Atlanta, WHIG in Dayton.
Reinsch was called on by Cox to assist in communications at the White House during the transition from the Roosevelt to Truman administrations in 1946.

In the 1960 presidential campaign, he suggested that the two opponents stand for the hour-long debate, knowing that Richard Nixon had injured a knee when he struck it on a car door. To Mr. Reinsch's surprise, Nixon agreed. He also served as a key advisor to Presidents Franklin Roosevelt and Harry Truman.

In March 1973, Reinsch was presented the coveted Gold Medal award from the International Radio and Television Society. He was a member of the Peabody Awards Board of Jurors from 1979 to 1985. In September 2003 the Library of American Broadcasting named Reinsch as one of the "First Fifty Giants of Broadcasting". 
Mr. Reinsch retired in 1973 from Cox Broadcasting.

References

External links
J. Leonard Reinsch Oral History Interview

1908 births
1991 deaths
People from Streator, Illinois
American radio executives
Cox Enterprises
20th-century American businesspeople